Freedom Cove is an artificial island located in Cypress Bay near Clayoquot Sound, British Columbia. The island was built by artists Wayne Adams and Catherine King. Construction of the island began in the summer of 1991 and has continued to the present day. The island consists of a dozen platforms that include greenhouses, an art gallery, an art studio and a dance floor. The platforms were built atop of recycled fish farming structures.

References

Artificial islands
Islands of British Columbia
1991 establishments in British Columbia